Wálter Veizaga (born 22 April 1988) is a Bolivian footballer who played as a midfielder for The Strongest

Club career
He started his career with Wilstermann  in 2010. In 2011, he joined Oriente Petrolero  and played 22 matches before joining The Strongest in 2012.

International career
He made his debut in a 5-0 loss against Mexico

References

External links
 
 
 

1986 births
Sportspeople from Cochabamba
Living people
Bolivian footballers
Association football midfielders
Bolivia international footballers
2015 Copa América players
Copa América Centenario players
The Strongest players
C.D. Jorge Wilstermann players
Oriente Petrolero players